= Jules Miller =

Businesswoman

- Born: 1990 (age 35–36); England
- Education: University of Birmingham
- Occupations: Entrepreneur, wellness leader

Jules Miller (born 1990) is an entrepreneur, wellness leader, and the CEO and founder of The Nue Co. supplement and herbal medicine brand.

Miller was born in Britain, but currently operates her business from Brooklyn. She is half Colombian and spent the first seven years of her life living in Colombia. She earned a degree in philosophy from Birmingham University. She began her career as a marketing professional in Detox Kitchen in London. She is also the co-founder of the BOW Summit.

She started The Nue Co. in 2017 after her 2015 diagnosis of irritable bowel syndrome for which she struggled to find medicinal and alternative medical treatments. She worked with her grandfather, Prof. George Miller, a pharmacist who was involved in the discovery of Vitamin B12, to develop The Nue Co. line of products; in 2019 she introduced the first natural supplement to enhance focus without effecting nerves.

She raised $1.5 million in round-one investment, and in 2019 reported an annual revenue of $10 million. In 2019, Miller secured $9 million in series A funding, which was led by Waldencast's Michel Brousett. Miller also secured funding from Unilever, but remains the largest shareholder in The Nue Co., with her husband rugby player Charlie Gower.
